The U.S. Chamber of Commerce Building is an historic Beaux Arts style building located at 1615 H St., NW., in Washington, D.C. It was built for the U.S. Chamber of Commerce and remains their headquarters.

History
It was designed by Cass Gilbert and built in 1925.  It was listed on the National Register of Historic Places in 1992, for its architecture.

The building occupies land that was formerly the home of Daniel Webster.

References

Beaux-Arts architecture in Washington, D.C.
Buildings and structures completed in 1925
Cass Gilbert buildings
Commercial buildings on the National Register of Historic Places in Washington, D.C.
United States Chamber of Commerce